Washington & Jefferson College is a private liberal arts college in Washington, Pennsylvania, which is located in the Pittsburgh metropolitan area. The college traces its origin to three log cabin colleges in Washington County established by three Presbyterian missionaries to the American frontier in the 1780s: John McMillan, Thaddeus Dod, and Joseph Smith. These early schools eventually grew into two competing academies and colleges, with Canonsburg Academy, later Jefferson College, located in Canonsburg and Washington Academy, later Washington College, in Washington. These two colleges merged in 1865 to form Washington & Jefferson College.

The Office of the President is located in McMillan Hall, which is the oldest building on campus, dating to 1793. Prior to 1912, the Office of the President was located in Old Main, taking the two rooms on either side of that building's main entrance. The President's House is a 17-room Victorian mansion on East Wheeling Street between the U. Grant Miller Library and The Burnett Center. It was built in 1892 by the Duncan family and is an archetypical Queen Anne Victorian style building, with ornate "gingerbread" details, stained and beveled glass, recessed doors and windows, and louvered wooden shutters.

The president is the chief executive officer of the college. According to the Washington & Jefferson College Charter, the president of the college is elected by the Board of Trustees, who can also remove him or her at will. The person holding this office must be an American citizen and is also considered to be a member of the teaching faculty. No one may be excluded from holding the presidency on "account of the religious sect or denomination to which he belongs or adheres, provided he shall demean himself in a soberly, orderly manner, and conform to the lawful rules and regulations of the college."

Two men, Andrew Wylie and Matthew Brown, each served as president of both Jefferson College and Washington College. Several early presidents of Jefferson College had close ties to John McMillan, including his son-in-law John Watson and his nephew William McMillan. James Dunlap was one of McMillan's early students. Other Jefferson College presidents held strong bonds with Matthew Brown, including his son Alexander Blaine Brown and his protégé and son-in-law David Hunter Riddle. James I. Brownson, who was a long-time pastor at the First Presbyterian Church, served two separate terms as president pro tempore, once for Washington College and later for Washington & Jefferson College. During World War II, Ralph Cooper Hutchison simultaneously served as president of the college and as Director of Civilian Defense for the Commonwealth of Pennsylvania. Boyd Crumrine Patterson was the most recent Washington & Jefferson alumnus to serve as president. In 2005, Tori Haring-Smith became the first woman to serve as president.

Founding and early leadership

Washington & Jefferson College originates from three log cabin colleges established by John McMillan, Thaddeus Dod, and Joseph Smith, Presbyterian missionaries to the American frontier in the 1780s. John McMillan came to present-day Washington County in 1775 and built his college in 1780 near his church in Chartiers, where he taught a mixture of college-level students and elementary students. Thaddeus Dod built his college in Lower Ten Mile in 1781, teaching mathematics and the classics. Joseph Smith taught classical studies in his college, called "The Study" at Buffalo.

In 1787, Washington Academy was officially chartered, and Thaddeus Dod was named the first principal on January 20, 1789, a position he held until July 1790. He was succeeded by David Johnson, who left for Canonsburg in July 1791. While the Washington Academy Board of Trustees still met during the period of unrest following the Whiskey Act and the subsequent Whiskey Rebellion, educational activities at the academy were essentially at a standstill. James Dobbins took control of the school between 1796 and 1801. Benjamin Mills followed, serving as principal from 1801 to 1805. In 1806, Matthew Brown began his term that would end later that year with the chartering of Washington College.

Efforts to found the school that would become Canonsburg Academy began in October 1791. David Johnson was brought to Canonsburg from Washington Academy in July 1791. He taught several students there for a few years, before leaving in 1793.  In 1798, John McMillan became the next person to hold the title of principal, then a largely ceremonial position. In 1802, the academy was chartered as "Jefferson College."

Presidents of Jefferson College
 A "–" indicates that the individual served as president pro tempore.

Presidents of Washington College

Presidents of Washington & Jefferson College

Notes

References
General

Specific

External links

Presidential History of Washington & Jefferson College

Washington and Jefferson College
Washington and Jefferson College